Deinacrida connectens, often referred to as the alpine scree wētā, is one of New Zealand's largest alpine invertebrates and is a member of the Anostostomatidae family. Deinacrida connectens is a flightless nocturnal insect that lives under rocks at high elevation. Mountain populations vary in colour. This species is the most widespread of the eleven species of giant wētā (Deinacrida).



Taxonomy 
Deinacrida connectens was originally described in 1939 by Swedish entomologist Kjell Ernst Viktor Ander as Deinacridopsis connectens, which was the only species of Deinacridopsis. However, Deinacridopsis was later recognized as a synonym of Deinacrida by New Zealand entomologist Graeme William Ramsay in 1961 and the species was moved to the Deinacrida genus. In the same paper, Ramsay also recognized Deinacrida sonitospina as a synonym of D. connectens, which was previously described by New Zealand entomologist John Salmon in 1950 from specimens found at Mount Peel and Mount Arthur.

Habitat/distribution

Deinacrida connectens is restricted to the South Island of New Zealand, where its distribution extends from the Wharepapa / Arthur Range in North West Nelson to the Takitimu Range in Southland. The range of D. connectens is known to overlap with the range of Deinacrida pluvialis in the western Otago mountains. This relatively widespread species distribution is unusual in the Deinacrida genus, where species usually have a restricted distribution. D. connectens generally inhabits scree slopes in alpine zones at elevations between 1200m and 3600m above sea level, but juveniles have also been found at 990m above sea level. It is not known what factor restricts them to this zone. The lower limit for their elevation range isolates populations on each mountain range.D. connectens has been alleged to be the most abundant species of Deinacrida.

Conservation
Under the 2014 New Zealand Threat Classification System, Deinacrida connectens is listed as a “Not Threatened” species and is the only species of Deinacrida not totally protected by legislation.

Due to being restricted to high elevation, it is thought that introduced mammalian predators are not a threat to D. connectens populations, since these predators are uncommon in these regions. This is in contrast to other Deinacrida species, which are generally at lower elevation and are more frequently preyed upon by introduced predators, causes a decline in giant wētā species abundance.

Diet
Deinacrida connectens is known to be omnivorous, but in the wild is generally observed feeding on plants. D. connectens has been observed in the wild browsing lichens, herbs and shrubs such as Aciphylla and Gaultheria depressa. In captivity D. connectens ate a range of “vegetables" (lettuce, carrot, clover, and dandelion leaves), fruit (apples, apricots), and raw beef, cheese and insects (cicadas, tenebrionid beetles). Feeding generally occurs early at night, after D. connectens has emerged from their daytime cover.

Ecology
Deinacrida connectens is New Zealand's largest nocturnal alpine insect, but occurs at lower abundance than smaller grasshopper and cockroach species in the same environment. The scree wētā is known to be capable of dispersing some fleshy fruit seeds by endozoochory. In an experiment, D. connectens' ability to disperse seeds of Gaultheria depressa by feeding was found to be dependent on the size of the wētā. At smaller sizes, fewer seeds were eaten and the wētā could be considered seed predators, (almost no seeds made it intact through the guts of individuals measuring 2 cm or less). With larger sized wētā however, thousands of seeds were consumed, some of which were presumably capable of being dispersed large distances, suggesting D. connectens can act as a seed disperser. One captive individual D. connectens was recorded successfully passing 686 intact seeds.

Morphology

Males of Deinacrida connectens, like other Deinacrida, are smaller than the females. Adult males are about 3.5 cm in length whereas adult females are about 4.5 cm in length. However, one source has described females measuring 7.2 cm long. Body weight of adults has been recorded to reach almost 10g.

Like other Anostostomatidae, D. connectens can produce sound by using their hind legs to rub their abdominal tergites. The hind legs rub against tiny "peg" like structures, referred to as stridulatory pegs.

Throughout the distribution of D. connectens, body colour shows extreme variation. In some populations, individuals may have mostly black bodies (for example, those in a population located at Spence Peak in Southland) whereas others may have a mix of red, grey and olive colours.

Breeding

The long legs of males compared to females suggest that like other members of this genus the scree wētā has a scramble competition mating system, in which adult females signal and males search for mates. However, males of Deinacrida connectens appear to invest little energy into reproductive behaviours, and provide small spermatophores. During mating in experimental conditions, males remain beneath the female, with the pair facing the same direction and with their bodies creating an angle of 30°. Copulation has been observed to last around 35 minutes. Mating would be concluded once the male walked away.

There is a single observation in experimental conditions of a male scree wētā attempting to separate a mating pair.

Behaviour
During the day, Deinacrida connectens remains under rocks and in crevices of scree slopes. They may nestle with other conspecifics during this time. During the night, D. connectens comes out of cover to feed on vegetation.

When disturbed, D connectens will either remain motionless or attempt to run away and if they need to defend themselves, they will raise their legs in a threatening posture and produce soft sounds. These sounds have been described as “soft and sibilant, rather like that produced by brushing together the heels of one's palms”.  D. connectens has been described as an aggressive species, and will bite if provoked (although they do not appear to be strong enough to break skin).

After feeding, D. connectens will engage in “perching” behaviour, where it stands at the peak of a rock for extended periods of time during the night.

In experimental conditions, individuals appeared to maintain an “individual distance” from one another while out at night. This boundary was maintained by producing sound and using their hind legs to push and kick away other individuals that got too close. However, this boundary does not seem to be maintained during the day, when individuals may huddle together under rocks and in crevices.

In laboratory conditions (at temperatures higher than they normally experience), large D. connectens have been known to travel nearly 6 metres per minute.

Phylogeography 
Genetic diversity within Deinacrida connectens is quite high and partitioned between populations.

In a phylogeography study of D. connectens, research found seven genetic lineages from mtDNA haplotypes, where each occupied a discrete geographic region. The average genetic difference between haplotypes was 4.8%, which is quite high for an insect. This phylogeographical structure combined with lineage age estimations suggests D. connectens radiated during the Pliocene mountain building that created the Southern Alps 5 million years ago. It was also suggested that subsequent glaciation may have helped foster isolation between population of D. connectens.

Physiology
Deinacrida connectens are adapted to be moderately freeze tolerant and are adapted to high elevation zones.

Cytogenetics 
Sex determination of most wētā species is by the number of large metacentric X-chromosomes; females have two X-chromosomes (XX) and males have one (X0). The scree wētā is diploid with an even number of chromosomes in females, and an odd number in males, but populations within this species have different numbers of chromosomes. There are seven known karyotypes within D. connectens. These karyotypes vary in number of chromosomes from 2n = 17(X0) to 2n = 22(XX). Known locations of these karyotype races are listed below.

References 

Weta
Anostostomatidae
Insects described in 1939